Women's writing may refer to a variety of topics related generally to women writers or women's literature:

 Chick lit, popular fiction targeted at younger women
 Écriture féminine, postmodern feminist literary theory
 Feminist literary criticism
 Women in speculative fiction, including science fiction
 Women's page, newspaper section for topics presumed to interest women
 Women's script (disambiguation), variation of syllabic characters in some writing systems
 Women's writing (literary category), academic discipline within literary studies

Lists
 List of women writers
 List of female rhetoricians
 List of biographical dictionaries of women writers
 List of biographical dictionaries of women writers in English
 List of early-modern British women novelists
 List of early-modern British women playwrights
 List of early-modern British women poets